Behbeit El Hagar is a village and an archaeological site in Lower Egypt that contains the remains of an ancient Egyptian temple to the goddess Isis, known as the Iseion. The village and the site lie in Gharbia Governorate along the Damietta branch of the Nile, 7 kilometers (4.5 mi) northeast of Sebennytos and 8 kilometers (5 mi) west of Mansoura. In ancient times it was part of the nome of Sebennytos, the Twelfth Lower Egyptian Nome. Ancient Egyptian texts refer to the site as early as the New Kingdom (c. 1550–1070 BC), but it may have been simply an offshoot of Sebennytos rather than a full-fledged town.

Sources as early as the Pyramid Texts, in the Fifth Dynasty indicate that Isis was connected with the region of Sebennytos, and she and her cult may have originated there. However, major temples were not dedicated to her until the Thirtieth Dynasty, when her temples at Philae and at Behbeit El Hagar began construction. The two temples paralleled each other, with Philae serving as Isis's main cult center in Upper Egypt and Behbeit El Hagar as its Lower Egyptian counterpart.

The Iseion was begun in the reign of Nectanebo II (360–342 BC) and completed in the reign of Ptolemy III (r. 246–222 BC). Whereas most Egyptian temples were built primarily of limestone or sandstone, with harder stones such as granite used only for individual elements such as statues, obelisks, or doorways, the temple at Behbeit El Hagar was built entirely of granite. The temple was demolished at some point, possibly in ancient times, by an earthquake or by the removal of its stone to serve as building material. Only scattered blocks remain there today.

See also
List of ancient Egyptian sites, including sites of temples

References

Further reading
Favard-Meeks, Christine (1991). Le temple de Behbeit el-Hagara. Essai de reconstitution et d'interprétation. Buske Verlag.
Favard-Meeks, Christine (2016). Behbeit el-Hagara web site

External links

Isis
Archaeological sites in Egypt
Former populated places in Egypt
Nile Delta
Egyptian temples
Archaeological discoveries with year of discovery missing
Buildings and structures completed in the 3rd century BC
3rd-century BC establishments in Egypt
Thirtieth Dynasty of Egypt

Populated places in Gharbia Governorate